Kiriakoffalia is a genus of tiger moths in the family Erebidae. The genus was erected by Hervé de Toulgoët in 1978. The moths in the genus are found in central Africa.

Species
 Kiriakoffalia costimacula (Joicey & Talbot, 1924)
 Kiriakoffalia guineae (Strand, 1912)
 Kiriakoffalia lemairei (Toulgoët, 1976)
 Kiriakoffalia lemairei paleacea (Toulgoët, 1978)

References

External links

Spilosomina
Moth genera